Louis Gerhardus Dunn (1908-1979) was a South African-born engineer who played a key role in the development of early American missiles and launch vehicles.

Caltech 
Dunn received both undergraduate and graduate degrees in aeronautical engineering from the California Institute of Technology (Caltech) in Pasadena, CA. During that time the Guggenheim Aeronautical Laboratory at Caltech (GALCIT), a prestigious aeronautical engineering research facility, was led by Theodore von Kármán. By 1943 Dunn had joined the Caltech faculty and become a naturalized U.S. citizen.

JPL 
In 1943 and 1944, von Kármán and Frank Malina, who had been doing rocket research at GALCIT, began using Jet Propulsion Laboratory (JPL) in the names of their projects. Malina hired Dunn to be the assistant director of JPL in 1945.  Dunn took over as acting director when Malina left and was formally appointed as director in 1947. Dunn resigned from this position in 1954. William Hayward Pickering, who had been project manager for the Corporal missile under Dunn, succeeded him as JPL director.

Ramo-Woolridge and Aerojet General 
After leaving JPL Dunn led the Atlas missile program at the Ramo-Wooldridge Corporation, a predecessor of TRW.
In 1963 he moved to Aerojet General, and he died at his home in Mountain Ranch, CA on August 13, 1979.

References

External links 

1908 births
1979 deaths
American aerospace engineers
South African emigrants to the United States
20th-century American engineers
Naturalized citizens of the United States